Adam Lee Burt (born January 15, 1969) is an American former professional ice hockey defenseman who played in the National Hockey League (NHL). He was drafted in the second round, 39th overall, by the Hartford Whalers in the 1987 NHL Entry Draft.

Playing career
As a youth, Burt played in the 1982 Quebec International Pee-Wee Hockey Tournament with the Detroit Compuware minor ice hockey team.

Burt played four seasons for the Ontario Hockey League's North Bay Centennials before joining the Whalers organization. He made his NHL debut for Hartford in the 1988–89 season, and he remained with the franchise through its transformation into the Carolina Hurricanes in 1997. Burt parted ways with the Hurricanes on March 6, 1999, when he was traded to the Philadelphia Flyers in exchange for Andrei Kovalenko. Burt played his final NHL season with the Atlanta Thrashers in 2000–01.

In his NHL career, Burt played in 737 games. He recorded 37 goals and 115 assists. He also appeared in 21 Stanley Cup playoff games, tallying one assist.

Burt is a noted born-again Christian. He currently serves as the senior associate pastor of Every Nation Church, New York in Manhattan, New York. When asked in an interview how he reconciled his beliefs with his oft-chippy demeanor on the ice, he responded with a Biblical quote: "Whatever you do, do it heartily as unto the Lord," (Colossians 3:23 NASB).  He now resides in New Jersey with his wife and two children.

Career statistics

Regular season and playoffs

International

References

External links
 

1969 births
Living people
American Christian religious leaders
American men's ice hockey defensemen
Atlanta Thrashers players
Binghamton Whalers players
Carolina Hurricanes players
Hartford Whalers draft picks
Hartford Whalers players
Ice hockey people from Detroit
North Bay Centennials players
Philadelphia Flyers players
Springfield Indians players